Balochki or Belochki is an obsolete term that may refer to:
 Balochi language, an Iranian language of Pakistan, Iran and Afghanistan
 Saraiki language, an Indo-Aryan language of Pakistan

References